The Nyungic languages are the south-westernmost of the Australian Aboriginal languages:

Nyungar languages
Galaagu language (Kalarko, Malpa)
Kalaamaya–Natingero

Galaagu and Kalaamaya/Natingero are poorly attested; it is not clear how close they are to each other or to Nyungar, and Kalaamaya may have been a variety of Nyungar proper. A variety called Nyaki Nyaki (Njakinjaki) has been variously said to be a dialect of Nyungar or of Kalaamaya.

The term Nyungic has been used for the bulk of the Southwest Pama–Nyungan languages (see). However, that is a geographical group, not a demonstrable family. Bowern restricts both terms to Nyungar plus Galaagu, which is poorly attested and had been misclassified as one of the Mirning languages.

References

 
Southwest Pama–Nyungan languages